Janet Elizabeth Rice (born 18 November 1960) is an Australian politician, member of the Australian Greens, former councillor and mayor of Maribyrnong, environmentalist, facilitator and one of the founding members of the Victorian Greens.

Early life
Rice was born in the Melbourne suburb of Altona. She attended the University of Melbourne, where she studied Mathematics and Meteorology. It was at Melbourne University where she met her partner, Penny Whetton, another student in the Meteorology department. Rice began her environmental activism whilst at University, including participating in the Franklin Dam Campaign in 1983.

Rice completed a Bachelor of Science, graduating with Honours in Meteorology.

Career
Rice began her career in September 1983 as a Nature Conservation Project Officer for the Conservation Council of Victoria now known as Environment Victoria where she was involved in policy and advocacy work on nature conservation issues for 2 years. In 1985, Rice moved to the East Gippsland Coalition as a forest campaigner. She was a leader of the campaign that resulted in the declaration of the Errinundra National Park and protection of the old growth forests of the Rodger River catchment in the Snow River National Park in 1988. Rice continued her work with the East Gippsland Coalition until 1990.

In 1985–1986, Rice worked as a Water Policy Officer at the Department of Water Resources, where she authored reports on Gippsland Water Resource and South East Region water management strategy and Environmental Aspects of Water Management Strategy for South West Victoria.

Rice worked for Bicycle Victoria from 1993 to 1997, as the inaugural Ride to Work Co-ordinator. She developed the Ride to Work Day program, which started with 615 cyclists and has grown to an estimated 60,000 participants all over Australia. From Bicycle Victoria, Rice pursued her career as a Senior Consultant at Context Pty Ltd. Rice worked with clients including the Barwon Water, Melbourne Water, Parks Victoria and a range of local governments. After leaving Context, Rice began her own facilitation and consultancy practice, Janet Rice Facilitation and Community Involvement. Rice was employed by the Hume City Council as their Senior Strategic Transport Planner.

Rice was also a Member of the School Council for Footscray City Primary School becoming the President between 2002 and 2003.

Rice is a Member of the advisory board at the Centre of Governance and Management of Public Transport.

Politics
Rice was a key element in establishing Australian Greens Victoria. She organised preliminary meetings, and helped form the green politics network just as the October 1992 Victorian state election approached. The Victorian Greens was officially launched on 7 November 1992.

In 2002 Rice was awarded Life Membership with the Australian Greens.

Rice started her political career when in 2003 she was elected the Greens Councillor for the city of Maribyrnong, where she represented the Saltwater ward. As a Councillor, Rice focused on Transport and Planning issues. She was Chair of the Metropolitan Transport Forum between 2004 and 2008. Rice's publications and presentations on transport include a chapter in the book "Transit Oriented Development: Making it Happen' (Curtis, Renne and Bertolini, 2009).

Rice was elected Mayor of Maribyrnong in 2006. During her mayoral term, she created the Maribyrnong Truck Action Group which succeeded in banning trucks from entering central Footscray. Rice was also a part of the Save Footscray Pool campaign, trying to preserve the aging facility and keep the site from developers. Rice remained in the council until 2008.

In 2008 and 2010 Rice worked with Greens Member for the Western Metropolitan Region, Colleen Hartland, managing community campaigns across Hartland's electorate.

Rice was the lead Senate candidate for the Australian Greens Victoria for the 2013 Australian federal election and was elected on a 10.85 percent primary vote.

Rice took her seat in the Senate on 1 July 2014, and was sworn in on 7 July 2014.

Rice was successfully re-elected in the 2016 Australian federal double-dissolution election, running second on the Australian Greens Victoria ticket.

Rice was again re-elected at the 2019 federal election, with a final Senate vote of 10.6%.

As of 2020, Rice serves as the Greens' Party Room Chair and Deputy Whip, and acts as the spokesperson for the following:

 Foreign Affairs
 Multiculturalism
 Forests
 LGBTIQ
 Transport & Infrastructure
 Science, Research & Innovation

Personal life
Rice lives in Footscray, Victoria with her two sons. Her wife was Penny Whetton, until her death on 11 September 2019.

Coinciding with her wife's gender transition, Rice came out as bisexual. She is currently one of eight members in the Parliament of Australia who are openly part of the LGBTI community.

References

External links
 Janet Rice's Australian Greens MPs website
 Janet Rice's Greens website
 
 Summary of parliamentary voting for Senator Janet Rice on TheyVoteForYou.org.au
 

Australian Greens members of the Parliament of Australia
Australian environmentalists
Australian women environmentalists
University of Melbourne alumni
1960 births
Living people
Women mayors of places in Victoria (Australia)
LGBT legislators in Australia
Bisexual politicians
Politicians from Melbourne
Members of the Australian Senate
Members of the Australian Senate for Victoria
Women members of the Australian Senate
21st-century Australian politicians
21st-century Australian women politicians
Mayors of places in Victoria (Australia)
People from Altona, Victoria